Macomb Township is located in McDonough County, Illinois. As of the 2010 census, its population was 502 and it contained 248 housing units.

Geography

Demographics

References

External links
 City-data.com
 Illinois State Archives

Townships in McDonough County, Illinois
Townships in Illinois